Bedford House or Bedford Estate may refer to:

Bedford House (Strand), the London home of the Russell family, Earls of Bedford
Bedford House (Bedford, Iowa), a historic hotel in Bedford, Iowa, U.S.
Bedford Estate, an estate in central London, England